Mary Meigs (April 27, 1917 – November 15, 2002) was an American-born painter and writer.

Early life
Meigs was born in Philadelphia, the daughter of Edward Browning Meigs and Margaret Wister Meigs, and grew up in Washington, D.C. Her great-great-grandfather was the obstetrician Dr. Charles Delucena Meigs, and her great-granduncle was Major General Montgomery C. Meigs, Quartermaster General of the United States Army during the American Civil War. She studied at Bryn Mawr College, graduating in 1939, and subsequently taught English literature and creative writing at that school. She served in the United States Navy's WAVES corps during World War II.

She subsequently studied art in New York City, and had her first exhibition of paintings in 1950.

Relationships
Openly lesbian, Meigs met author Barbara Deming in 1954. Deming and Meigs became a couple and moved to Wellfleet, Massachusetts, where they joined a Cape Cod artistic circle that included abstract painter Mark Rothko, critic Edmund Wilson, and writer Mary McCarthy.

In 1963, Wilson introduced Meigs to Marie-Claire Blais, a writer from Quebec who became romantically involved with Meigs and Deming. The three women lived together for six years. Meigs and Deming drifted apart, and in 1972 Meigs and Blais moved to Brittany. The couple subsequently returned to Montreal in 1976, where Meigs spent the remainder of her life.

Writings and later life
In the 1970s, Meigs turned to writing, publishing books such as Lily Briscoe: A Self-Portrait (1981), The Medusa Head (1983) and The Box Closet (1987). In addition to her writing, she became a prominent spokesperson in Canada for lesbian, feminist, and seniors' issues. She died in Montreal in 2002, following a series of strokes.

Meigs was instrumental in helping administer and support The Money for Women Fund, founded by Barbara Deming to support the work of feminist artists.  After Deming's death in 1984, the organization was renamed as the Barbara Deming Memorial Fund.  Today, the foundation is the "oldest ongoing feminist granting agency" which "gives encouragement and grants to individual feminists in the arts (writers, and visual artists)."

Depictions
Mary McCarthy's 1955 novel A Charmed Life depicts Meigs as "Dolly Lamb", a tiresome artist whose paintings were "cramped with preciosity and mannerism".

In 1990, Meigs appeared in the Canadian docudrama film The Company of Strangers. She published a book about her experiences making the film, In the Company of Strangers, in 1991.

References

External links 
 Materials about Mary Meigs in the Mary Meigs papers held by Bryn Mawr College Special Collections 
  Archives of Mary Meigs (Fonds Mary Meigs, R11779) are held at Library and Archives Canada. The fonds relates the relationship between Mary Meigs and avec Marie-Claire Blais.
  Archives of Mary Meigs Fonds Mary Meigs (MSS418) are also held at Bibliothèque et Archives nationales du Québec. The fonds contains records related to the translation in French of Mary Meigs' works by Michelle Thériault.
  Some letters of Mary Meigs are held in the Fonds Marie-Claire Blais (R1710) at Library and Archives Canada

1917 births
2002 deaths
American expatriate writers in Canada
Bryn Mawr College alumni
American expatriates in France
Canadian feminist writers
Canadian non-fiction writers
Canadian women non-fiction writers
Canadian lesbian writers
Feminist artists
American lesbian writers
Artists from Philadelphia
American feminist writers
Writers from Philadelphia
LGBT people from Pennsylvania
WAVES personnel
United States Navy sailors
20th-century American non-fiction writers
20th-century Canadian LGBT people
Anglophone Quebec people
People from Westmount, Quebec
Canadian lesbian artists
American lesbian artists